The 2012 Iowa Hawkeyes football team represented the University of Iowa in the 2012 NCAA Division I FBS football season. They were led by 14th year head coach Kirk Ferentz and play their home games at Kinnick Stadium. They are a member of the Legends Division of the Big Ten Conference. The team finished 2–6 in conference play, 4–8 overall and failed to become bowl-eligible for the first time since 2000. As of 2021, this is the most recent losing season for the program.

Schedule

Source:

Roster

Regular season

Northern Illinois

Source

Iowa State

Source

Northern Iowa

Source

Central Michigan

Source

Minnesota

Source

Michigan State

Source

Penn State

Source

Northwestern

Source

Indiana

Source

Purdue

Source

Michigan

Source

Nebraska

Source

Players in the 2013 NFL Draft

References

External links

Iowa
Iowa Hawkeyes football seasons
Iowa Hawkeyes football